Fellows of the Royal Society elected in 1979.

Fellows

Jerzy Neyman  (1894–1981)
Janet Vida Watson  (1923–1985)
Evelyn Martin Lansdowne Beale  (1928–1985)
Yakov Borisovich Zel'dovich  (1914–1987)
William Charles Evans  (1911–1988)
Dame Janet Maria Vaughan  (1899–1993)
Alastair Graham  (1906–2000)
Patrick Anthony Merton  (1920–2000)
Julius Axelrod  (1912–2004)
Digby Johns McLaren  (1919–2004)
John Maxwell Cowley  (1923–2004)
Winifred Anne Tutin  (1915–2007)
Durward William John Cruickshank  (1927–2007)
John Hilton Edwards  (d. 2007)
Michael Elliott  (d. 2007)
Joshua Lederberg  (d. 2008)
Milton Robert James Salton  (d. 2008)
Olgierd Cecil Zienkiewicz  (d. 2009)
Harry Smith  (1921–2011)
Sir Bernard Crossland  (d. 2011)
David Alan Walker  (1928–2012)
Godfrey Harry Stafford  (1920–2013)
Sir Kenneth Murray  (1930–2013)
John Robert Laurence Allen
Michael Farries Ashby
Michael Joseph Crumpton
Sir Michael Anthony Epstein
Raymond Freeman
Sir Richard Lavenham Gardner
Cyril Hilsum
Sir David Alan Hopwood
Keith Usherwood Ingold
Edward Irving
Geoffrey Melvill Jones
Devendra Lal
Michael Franz Lappert
Ian Grant Macdonald
Robert McCredie May Baron May of Oxford
Brenda Atkinson Milner
Denis Noble
Martin John Rees Baron Rees of Ludlow
Paul Harry Roberts
John Griggs Thompson
David James Thouless (1934–2019)

References

1979
1979 in science
1979 in the United Kingdom